James Joseph Keogh (10 September 1897 – 1 June 1963) was an Australian rules footballer who played with Collingwood in the Victorian Football League (VFL).

Family
The son of Thomas William Keogh (1860–1928) and Flora Jane Keogh (1872–1955), née Titus, James Joseph Keogh was born at Mitcham, Victoria on 10 September 1897.

Education
He was educated at St Patrick's College, Ballarat.

Military service
Aged 18, Keogh enlisted in the First AIF in May 1916, and served overseas, returning to Australia in June 1919.

Football

Collingwood (VFL)
Jim Keogh played four games for Collingwood in 1921, but struggled to gain a regular place in the Collingwood team.

Brunswick (VFA)
Keogh transferred to Brunswick in 1922 where he played for the next four seasons.

Notes

References
 
 World War One Embarkation Roll: Gunner James Joseph Keogh (28484), collection of the National Archives of Australia.
 World War One Nominal Roll: Gunner James Joseph Keogh (28484), collection of the National Archives of Australia.
 World War One Service Record: Gunner James Joseph Keogh (28484), National Archives of Australia.

External links 

	
 	
Jim Keogh's playing statistics from The VFA Project
Jim Keogh's profile at Collingwood Forever

1897 births
1963 deaths
People educated at St Patrick's College, Ballarat
Australian rules footballers from Melbourne
Collingwood Football Club players
Brunswick Football Club players
People from Mitcham, Victoria
Australian military personnel of World War I
Military personnel from Melbourne